Akyem Bosome describes a sub national traditional geo-political entity in the eastern regions of the Ashantiland Peninsula. It is the smallest of the three Akyem states, including Akyem Abuakwa and Akyem Kotoku, that form the Akyem Mansa—which is a nation-state of non-contiguous boundaries situated in the Eastern and Ashanti regions on the Ashantiland Peninsula. The capital of Akyem Bosome is Soadru, a town with a population of approximately 12,000 people. The native language is Ashanti language Ashanti Twi.

History
Akyem Bosome was founded during the last decade of the 18th century through a purchase of land by Ntow Korkor from the family of Barima Atwere, Wenkyihene and Asiawuohene of Akyem Abuakwa, after which the bulk of the Bosome people then migrated in 1831 after the Gyaaman war from Omanso, a settlement around present day Lake Bosomtwi in Kokofu to take complete possession of the land.

Other Bosome settlements are: Adiemra, Amantia, Anamaase, Aperade, Babianeha, Brenase, Ofoase. There are also the settlements of Adieto and Yaapisaa at Kokofu, Ehwuren and Atafram, all in the Ashanti Region, that owe allegiance to Akyem Bosome.

The traditional head of Akyem Bosome is the current Omanhene, Okotwaasuo Kantamanto Owoare Agyekum III. Subordinate to him are the "Adakrohene of Bosome"(?). These are the Ahenfo(?) of the other Bosome settlements.

Politics
Some historical rulers of Bosome were Nana Koragye Ampaw and Nana Oware Agyekum II.

See also
Akan people
Rulers of the Akan state of Akyem Bosume
Rulers of Ghana
Gold Coast region

References

Akyem
Akan
Geography of Ghana